Football Champion is a 1973 Indian Malayalam-language sports film produced by T. E. Vasudevan under the banner of Jaya Maruthi, directed by A. B. Raj and written by V. Devan. The film stars Prem Nazir, Sujatha, Jayakumari, K. P. Ummer, Adoor Bhasi and Innocent in the lead roles. The film has musical score by V. Dakshinamoorthy.

Cast

Prem Nazir as Vijayan/Veera Swami (Double Role)
Sujatha as Thulasi
Innocent as Football Player
Adoor Bhasi as KPK Nair
Sankaradi as Coach Pilla
T. R. Omana
Paul Vengola
Alummoodan as Mathachan Muthalali
G. K. Pillai
Jayakumari
K. P. Ummer as Ravi
Paravoor Bharathan as Roti Raman Pillai
 Thodupuzha Radhakrishnan
 Seema

Soundtrack
The music was composed by V. Dakshinamoorthy and the lyrics were written by Sreekumaran Thampi.

References

External links
 

1973 films
1970s Malayalam-language films
Films directed by A. B. Raj